Harrison James Maurus (born 26 February 2000) is an American weightlifter, competing in the 77 kg category until 2018 and 81 kg starting in 2018 after the International Weightlifting Federation reorganized the categories.

Career
He was the bronze medalist in the clean & jerk and total at the 2017 World Weightlifting Championships in the 77 kg category.

He represented the United States at the 2020 Summer Olympics.

Major results

References

External links 
 

Living people
2000 births
Sportspeople from Miami
American male weightlifters
Pan American Games medalists in weightlifting
Pan American Games bronze medalists for the United States
Weightlifters at the 2019 Pan American Games
World Weightlifting Championships medalists
Medalists at the 2019 Pan American Games
Sportspeople from Washington (state)
Pan American Weightlifting Championships medalists
Weightlifters at the 2020 Summer Olympics
Olympic weightlifters of the United States
21st-century American people